Bob Danskin (28 May 1908 – 14 September 1985) was an English professional footballer who played as a defender for Leeds United and Bradford Park Avenue.

References

1908 births
1985 deaths
Footballers from Newcastle upon Tyne
English footballers
Association football defenders
English Football League players
Leeds United F.C. players
Bradford (Park Avenue) A.F.C. players